Ann was launched in America in 1800, possibly under another name. She transferred to the United Kingdom in 1805. Between 1810 and 1813 she became a temporary packet operating out of Falmouth, Cornwall for the Post Office Packet Service. American privateers twice captured her in 1813 in single ship actions.

Career
Ann first appeared in Lloyd's Register (LR) in 1805.

Packet
The Post Office in 1810 took on Ann as a temporary packet. Her first captain was John Britton, whose appointment date was 6 August 1810.

On 12 January 1811 Ann came into Plymouth. She had been returning from Cadiz when she had had to repel an attack by a French privateer.<ref>"SHIP NEWS". Morning Chronicle (London, England), 15 January 1811; Issue 13006.</ref>Ann, Britton, master, sailed from Falmouth on 9 March and arrived in Bermuda on 16 April. She sailed form Bermuda on 21 April and arrived in New York on 29 April

While Ann was in New York and observed vessels coming from Ireland, Liverpool, and Bristol with passengers, mostly "emigrant mechanics". These men could, 24 hours after arriving, acquire certificates of American citizenship. However, many found it difficult to find work. Many then joined the US Navy. Although he believed that they would be glad to desert and come to Ann, he did not take them as he was afraid that the Americans would accuse him of "harbouring their seamen." Two Englishmen did jump from President to swim to Ann; one was believed to have drowned and the other succeeded in reaching her. Ann took him aboard and back to England. The seaman testified on his return that he had been a quarter-gunner aboard President for the Little Belt affair. Man further testified that out of Presidents crew of some 500 men, some 300 were English, Scots, or Irish, and that President had fired the first shot in the affair. The man was impressed into , then serving as a guardship at Falmouth. 

On 8 June Ann sailed from New York and on the 17th she arrived at Halifax, Nova Scotia. She left Halifax on 30 June and arrived back at Falmouth on 21 July. 

FateAnn, Captain Peter Hill (acting), sailed from Falmouth on 12 April 1813, bound for the Leeward Islands and Jamaica. The American privateer Yorktown, of 380 tons (bm), 16 guns, and 180 men, captured Ann off the Western Isles on 21 April after an action of two hours. In the engagement Ann had one man killed and three wounded. The Americans kept Captain Hill, the surgeon, and the steward, and put the rest of the crew aboard a "licensed" American vessel, bound for Lisbon. There the packet  took them on and brought them back to Falmouth.   

On 16 May  recaptured Ann near Sandy Hook and sent her to Halifax, Nova Scotia. However, On 23 May 1813 the American privateer Young Teazer again captured Ann. She had a prize crew of a midshipman and some 15 sailors aboard who resisted until they had suffered two men lightly wounded and had their rigging and sails shot up. The action and chase had lasted from 8am to 7pm. Young Teazer sent Ann into Young Teazer''s home port of Portland, Maine.

Notes

References

1800 ships
Ships built in the United States
Age of Sail merchant ships of England
Falmouth Packets
Captured ships